Barcikowiczki  is a district of the city of Zielona Góra, in western Poland, located in the southern part of the city. It was a separate village until 2014.

References

Neighbourhoods in Poland
Zielona Góra